A one-third octave is a logarithmic unit of frequency ratio equal to either one third of an octave (1200/3 = 400 cents: major third) or one tenth of a decade (3986.31/10 = 398.631 cents: M3 ).  An alternative (unambiguous) term for one tenth of a decade is a decidecade.

Definitions

Base 2
A one-third octave (base 2) is precisely 400 cents.

Base 10
This unit is referred to by ISO 18405 as a "decidecade" or "one-third octave (base 10)".

One decidecade is equal to 100 savarts (approximately 398.631 cents).

See also
Decibel
Octave band
Pseudo-octave
Tritonic scale

References

Further reading
   (22 pages)

Intervals (music)
Logarithmic scales of measurement